The Woodrow Wilson Monument, created by Czech-American sculptor Albin Polasek, is installed outside Praha hlavní nádraží in Prague, Czech Republic. It was unveiled in October 2011, and honors the 28th president of the United States, Woodrow Wilson.

See also

 List of memorials to Woodrow Wilson
 List of sculptures of presidents of the United States
 Statue of Woodrow Wilson (Austin, Texas), formerly installed at the University of Texas at Austin

References

External links
 

2011 establishments in the Czech Republic
2011 sculptures
Monuments and memorials in Prague
Outdoor sculptures in Prague
Sculptures of men in Prague
Statues in Prague
Wilson, Woodrow
New Town, Prague
21st-century architecture in the Czech Republic